Cosmiza longeciliata is a taxonomic synonym that can refer to:

Utricularia longeciliata syn. Cosmiza longeciliata (A.DC.) Small
Utricularia simulans syn. [Cosmiza longeciliata Small]

Utricularia by synonymy